Dear Monsters is the third studio album by the American heavy metal band Bad Wolves. It was released on October 29, 2021 through Better Noise Music and was produced by Josh Gilbert. It is the first album to feature vocalist Daniel "DL" Laskiewicz, after the departure of Tommy Vext from the band in January 2021 and the final to feature rhythm guitarist Chris Cain, following his departure in April 2022.

Background and recording
Following the completion of their tour promoting N.A.T.I.O.N. (2019), Bad Wolves began writing music for their third studio album. In an interview in October 2020, former Bad Wolves vocalist Tommy Vext confirmed that the band had almost completed their third studio album and that they may release it six months early exclusively via Patreon. However, on January 8, 2021, Vext announced his departure from the band, with intention to launch his own solo career.

On June 2, 2021, Bad Wolves announced Daniel "DL" Laskiewicz had joined the band as their lead vocalist and that they were working on their third album called Dear Monsters, which they claimed would be "the best Bad Wolves album to date". Laskiewicz was previously involved in the songwriting of N.A.T.I.O.N.

According to Laskiewicz, "The album [Dear Monsters] was about 60% done when I joined the band." Despite this, Laskiewicz was involved in the songwriting and helped the other band members with the completion of the remaining 40% of the album.

Release and promotion
It is supported by the singles "Lifeline" and "If Tomorrow Never Comes". Bad Wolves was originally going to promote the album as a support act on Tremonti's European tour in January 2022 but the tour was later rescheduled. They instead supported Papa Roach's Kill The Noise tour in March 2022. A deluxe edition of the album was released on October 28, 2022.

Critical reception

Dear Monsters was met with mixed to favorable reviews. KJ Draven of Wall of Sound writes "They [Bad Wolves] have written some cool heavy riffs and more melodic tracks to put together a collection that has peaks and valleys that make for a great drinkin’ and singin’ album… There are decent album tracks, and might even make good singles, but they don’t rock me."

Alan Ronson of Brutal Planet adds “Bad Wolves has proved they can not only make great music but can sustain the behemoth of the music industry and endure a change in their lineup. It takes a special kind of determination to undergo all that affliction and come out on top with an album as stunning as this. 'Dear Monsters' is an intense and passionate response to all the beasts who attempted to devour them."

Track listing

Personnel
Bad Wolves
 Daniel "DL" Laskiewicz – lead vocals
 Doc Coyle – lead guitar, backing vocals
 Chris Cain – rhythm guitar, backing vocals
 Kyle Konkiel – bass, backing vocals
 John Boecklin – drums, percussion, producer

Production
 Josh Gilbert – producer

References

2021 albums
Bad Wolves albums